The Robert Morris Colonials women represented Robert Morris University in CHA women's ice hockey during the 2017-18 NCAA Division I women's ice hockey season. The Colonials are the defending CHA champions.

Offseason
4/4: Aneta Lédlová was a leading scorer for the Czech National Team at the IIHF World Championships, held in April, 2017 in Plymouth, Michigan.

Recruiting

Standings

Roster

2017–18 Colonials

2017-18 schedule
Source:

|-
!colspan=12 style=" "| Regular Season

|-
!colspan=12 style=" "|CHA Tournament

Awards and honors
Brittany Howard,2017-18 Second Team All-America

References

Robert Morris
Robert Morris Lady Colonials ice hockey seasons
Robert
Robert